Charles Foulkes may refer to:
Charles Foulkes (British Army officer) (1875–1969), British general, adviser on gas warfare in World War I, and field hockey player
Charles Foulkes (Canadian Army general) (1903–1969), Canadian soldier who served in World War II
Charles Foulkes (footballer) (1905–1986), English footballer who played for Lincoln City in the 1920s

See also
 Charles ffoulkes (1868–1947), British historian